Precious Moloi-Motsepe (born 2 August 1964) is a South African philanthropist and fashion entrepreneur. One of the richest women in South Africa she started her career as a medical practitioner, specializing in children and women’s health. In September 2019 she was elected Chancellor of the University of Cape Town, succeeding Graça Machel, and beginning her ten-year term on 1 January.

In 2007, she established African Fashion International. The events, fashion and lifestyle company to promote pan-African designers to international audiences, and indorse the African fashion industry as a pathway to economic development for young people and women. In 2013, she joined the Giving Pledge with her husband, committing to give half of their family wealth to charitable causes. In the same year she graced the inaugural cover of Forbes Women Africa and has since been considered one of the 50 most powerful women on the continent by Forbes Magazine Africa.

She is a regular delegate to the World Economic Forum held in Davos, as well as a member of the Harvard Kennedy School Women’s Leadership Board. She also sits on the Advisory Board for the Milken Institute’s Center for Strategic Philanthropy.

Early life and education
Born in Soweto, and one of five siblings, her father was a teacher and her mother was a nurse She attended Wits University where she graduated with an MBBCh degree in 1987 and worked in the United States at the Medical College of Virginia in Richmond from 1991 to 1992. Upon her return to South Africa, she pursued a diploma in child health from the University of the Witwatersrand, as well as a diploma in women’s health from Stellenbosch University.

In 1989, she married Patrice Motsepe, a lawyer who was also brought up in Soweto. Forbes Magazine Africa estimated her family's wealth at $3 billion and noted that they were South Africa's wealthiest black couple. She is of Tswana descent.

Career 
In 1993 she opened a women's health clinic in Rivonia, Johannesburg. From 2002 until 2007 she served as President of the Cancer Association of South Africa (CANSA), earning her the Elizabeth Tshabalala Award for her cancer awareness efforts in 2012.

Philanthropy 
She cofounded the Motsepe Foundation with her husband in 1999, with a mission to contribute towards eradicating poverty and to sustainably improve the living conditions and standards of living of poor, unemployed and marginalized people in South Africa, Africa and the world. In 2002 she took over its leadership as Chief Executive Officer and leads five main programmes: education and leadership; gender equality; community development; sport, music and arts; and social cohesion. In 2012, she spearheaded the Gender Responsive Budget Initiative, advocating for reviews and analysis of national plans and budgets to ensure that the needs of women are specifically and equally addressed. The Gender Responsive Budget Initiative has since been adopted by the South African parliament.

In 2015, she and her husband were honored by the Keep a Child Alive Foundation for their efforts addressing the issues of social and economic inequality of Africa’s poorest people, and for their generous support of HIV and AIDS initiatives over the years.

In 2017 she published The Precious Little Black Book to empower South African women with information about their rights, health and economic empowerment. Following this, she took over the reins from Melinda Gates as co-chair of the global women’s philanthropic organization Maverick Collective in 2018.

In 2020, she donated R5 million to the University of Cape Town through the Motsepe Foundation. The donation, made at the outset of the COVID-19 pandemic, was allocated to assist with university sustainability, as well as the procurement of laptops and data for students to resume learning remotely.

In 2021, she donated a further R2 million to the University of Cape Town through the Motsepe Foundation, to assist students who completed their studies but were unable to graduate and receive their degree certificates because of student debt.

Business 
In 2007, she conceptualised African Fashion International (AFI) as a socially conscious, luxury African fashion platform that will propel pan-African designers into international markets and create opportunities for job creation along the supply chain. AFI is best known for its world-class fashion and lifestyle events production and has since grown into the luxury e-commerce sector as purveyors of unique fashion and accessories from Africa and the diaspora. Becoming the first fashion week platform on the continent sponsored by Mercedes Benz, the front row of AFI Fashion Week has been graced by Suzy Menkes of Condé Nast International and Fern Mallis of New York Fashion Week.

In 2017, she was the first recipient of the Franca Sozzani Award at the United Nations in New York for her efforts to promote African designers through her firm and support the empowerment of disadvantaged women.

She is currently an advisor to the Copenhagen Global Fashion Agenda Summit, promoting sustainable investments in fashion, and is the only representative from Africa.

References

Living people
People from Soweto
South African general practitioners
University of the Witwatersrand alumni
Event management
21st-century South African businesswomen
21st-century South African businesspeople
1964 births
Chancellors of the University of Cape Town